Chryseobacterium gregarium  is a bacterium from the genus of Chryseobacterium which has been isolated from plant material.

References

Further reading

External links
Type strain of Chryseobacterium gregarium at BacDive -  the Bacterial Diversity Metadatabase

gregarium
Bacteria described in 2008